The 2020–21 Biathlon World Cup – Stage 10 is the 10th event of the season and was held in Östersund, Sweden, from 19 to 21 March 2021. Originally it was scheduled to be held at Oslo-Holmenkollen, Norway, but due to the restrictions, imposed by the Norwegian government due to the COVID-19 pandemic, on 13 February it was announced that the final round will be held at Östersund.

Schedule of events 
The events took place at the following times.

Podium results

Men

Women

References 

2020–21 Biathlon World Cup
Biathlon World Cup
Biathlon World Cup
Biathlon competitions in Sweden
Sports competitions in Östersund